The following is a list of the 15 cantons of the Eure-et-Loir department, in France, following the French canton reorganisation which came into effect in March 2015:

 Anet
 Auneau
 Brou
 Chartres-1
 Chartres-2
 Chartres-3
 Châteaudun
 Dreux-1
 Dreux-2
 Épernon
 Illiers-Combray
 Lucé
 Nogent-le-Rotrou
 Saint-Lubin-des-Joncherets
 Les Villages Vovéens

References